"Jidaishin" is Do As Infinity's 24th single, released on September 29, 2010. It was released on the band's 11th anniversary and was sold only at the mu-mo website in Japan. This single was offered in two different ways, both with special boxes that brought the CD plus some personalized face and body towels. It contains two tracks: the single and its instrumental version. It was composed by Kazunori Watanabe. The same day Do As Infinity released the single, there was a free concert, aired on the Nico Nico Douga website for its promotion.

Track listing

References

External links
"Jidaishin" at Do As Infinity's official website 

2010 singles
Do As Infinity songs
Song recordings produced by Seiji Kameda
2010 songs
Avex Trax singles